Faheem Hussain (31 July 1942 – 29 September 2009), was a Pakistani theoretical physicist and a professor of physics at the Lahore University of Management Sciences (LUMS). A research scientist in the field of superstring theory at the National Center for Physics, Hussain made contributions to the fields of superstring and string theory. He was the first Pakistani physicist to publish a research paper in the field of superstring theory. A social activist and democratic activist, he authored various scientific research papers in peer-reviewed journals.

Education and early life
Faheem Hussain was born in Yavatmal, Maharashtra, British India in 1942. His family moved to West Pakistan shortly before the Partition of India on 14 August 1947. He graduated from St. Anthony's High School, Lahore, in 1955 and then enrolled in Forman Christian College.
After receiving his double BSc(Hons) in Mathematics and Physics from Forman Christian College in 1960, he moved to the Great Britain. There, he attended Chelsea College, London, and completed another B.S. (hons) in physics in 1963. He attended Imperial College, London where physicist Abdus Salam was also teaching. He began working with Abdus Salam's group at the Imperial College. He completed his MSc in physics from Imperial College, London under Abdus Salam, and followed by his PhD in Theoretical physics under the supervision of theoretical particle physicist Paul Matthews in 1966.

Academic career

He taught at Garyounis University, Benghazi, Libya, from 1977 to 1979. In 1985 joined Deutsches Elektronen Synchrotron, better known as DESY, in Germany. Prior to this, Hussain moved to Geneva, Switzerland and joined the European Organization for Nuclear Research (CERN). He had also been a visiting professor at the Johannes Gutenberg University of Mainz, Germany. There, with Juergen Koerner, George Thompson and others, he calculated relativistic-wave functions for hadrons and used Salam's formalism to develop a variant of the heavy quark effective theory. The Mainz group went on to make valuable contributions to the study of heavy baryon decays.

ICTP career
Hussain joined the Abdus Salam International Centre for Theoretical Physics (ICTP) at the request of Salam. He worked there as a senior staff scientist in Trieste, Italy. There he was originally involved in developing the high energy physics diploma programme, which helps train young graduates from developing countries to start research in physics. He was the head of the office of external activities for six years. Of late, he was working in superstring theory, the physics of extra dimensions and non-commutative geometry. Hussain published extensively in the field of theoretical elementary particle physics. He also published articles and papers to solve the science and technology problems in underdeveloped countries.

Support for democracy in Pakistan
After the Coup d'état by General Muhammad Zia-ul-Haq, Hussain publicly opposed Zia-ul-Haq's Islamization of Pakistan and supported democracy in his country. Hussain left Pakistan in 1989 and joined ICTP at the request of Abdus Salam.

Return to Pakistan
Hussain worked as a senior staff scientist at ICTP from 1990 then took his retirement and returned to Pakistan in 2004. There, he joined the physics research institute, the National Center for Physics.

Research in physics
Hussain, along with Riazuddin, Fayyazuddin, and Hamid Saleem, carried out a research on the string theory and published in the field of mathematical physics. Later, he moved to Lahore and was offered a position at the Lahore University of Management Sciences or LUMS's science department. He eventually became a chairperson of the Physics Department there. At LUMS, Hussain began his research in noncommutative geometry and superstring theory. There, he formed a "Mathematical Physics Group" (MPG), the MPG group consists of Pakistan's noted physicists, Asad Naqvi, Tasneem Zehra Hussain, and Amer Iqbal. He there began his work and published articles in the field of Extra dimensions, Noncommutative geometry, and the string theory.

Personal life
Hussain was married to Jane Steinfels Hussain, an American woman, from 1968 to 1986.  He later married Sara Monticone Hussain.

Death
Hussain was suffering from prostate cancer in 2009. Hussain died on 29 September 2009.

Bibliography

 Mathematical Physics by Riazuddin and Faheem Hussain
 IIIrd Regional Conference on Mathematical Physics by Faheem Hussain and Asghar Qadir
 Contemporary Physics: Proceedings of the International Symposium by Jamil Aslam, Faheem Hussain, and Riazuddin.

Research papers
 The Theoretical Physics Group at Quaid-e-Azam University
 Hadrons of arbitrary spin and heavy quark symmetry by Faheem Hussain, Thompson, G ; Körner, J G
Interactions and dynamics of D-branes / Hussain, F ; Lengo, R ; Núñez, C ; Scrucca, C A
Black hole – D-brane correspondence : An example / Bertolini, M ; Fré, P ; Hussain, F ; Iengo, R ; Núñez, C ; Scrucca, Claudio A.
Interaction of D-branes on orbifolds and massless particle emission / Hussain, F ; Iengo, R ; Núñez, C ; Scrucca, Claudio A
Closed string radiation from moving D-branes / Hussain, F ; Iengo, R ; Núñez, C ; Scrucca, Claudio A
Aspects of D-brane dynamics on orbifolds / Hussain, F ; Iengo, R ; Núñez, C ; Scrucca, Claudio A
On the form factors of the Ds+ --> + decay / Hussain, F ; Ivanov, A N ; Troitskaya, N I
An introduction to the heavy quark effective theory / Hussain, F ; Thompson, G
Non-commutative geometry and supersymmetry, 2 / Hussain, F ; Thompson, G

References

External links
ICTP Page on Hussain
 Faheem Hussain
 Tribute paid to Faheem Hussain
 In the Memory of Faheem Hussain
LUMS Science Faculty
 ICTP Page of Faheem Hussain
 Hussain
 Remembering Dr. Faheem Hussain
 Remember an Physics Icon
 Mathematical Physics by Faheem Hussain, Riazuddin, Asghar Qadir, Mohammad Jamil Aslam, Hamid Saleem
 Scientific publications of Faheem Hussain on INSPIRE-HEP

1942 births
2009 deaths
Muhajir people
Academic staff of Lahore University of Management Sciences
Pakistani physicists
Pakistani Marxists
Pakistani string theorists
Pakistani science writers
Academics of Imperial College London
Alumni of the University of London
People associated with CERN
Forman Christian College alumni
Academic staff of Quaid-i-Azam University
Project-706 people
Indian emigrants to Pakistan